The Order of Saint Ignatius of Antioch is an honorific lay order and ecclesiastical decoration founded in 1985 by the Patriarch of the Syriac Catholic Church. Its current Grand Master is Patriarch Ignatius Joseph III Yonan.

The Order of Saint Ignatius of Antioch, while completely independent of the Holy See, is under ecclesiastical patronage sui iuris by the Syriac Catholic Patriarchate of Antioch in accordance with the Code of Canons of the Eastern Churches. As such, it is recognised as a legitimate ecclesiastical decoration by the International Commission on Orders of Chivalry.

References 

 
Christian organizations established in 1985
Catholic religious orders established in the 20th century
1985 establishments in Syria